Svyatoslav Semenov (born 2 February 1962) is a retired Soviet swimmer. He competed at the 1982 World Aquatics Championships and won silver medals in the 400 m and 1500 m freestyle events. He missed the 1984 Summer Olympics, which were boycotted by the Soviet Union, and took part in the Friendship Games instead, winning two bronze medals in the same freestyle events. Between 1980 and 1984, he won four national titles in various freestyle events.

He graduated from the National University of Physical Education and Sports of Ukraine. Since 1989 he competed in the masters category.

References

1962 births
Living people
Ukrainian male swimmers
Ukrainian male freestyle swimmers
World Aquatics Championships medalists in swimming
Universiade medalists in swimming
Universiade silver medalists for the Soviet Union
Universiade bronze medalists for the Soviet Union
Medalists at the 1983 Summer Universiade
Sportspeople from Kyiv